Slavoljub or Slavolub (Cyrillic script: Славољуб) is a masculine given name derived from the Slavic elements: slava "glory, famous" and ljub "favour, love, to like". Nicknames: Slava, Slavko, Ljuba. Other form: Ljuboslav.

List of people with the given name Slavoljub
Slavoljub Đorđević, Serbian footballer
Slavoljub Muslin, Serbian footballer and manager
Slavoljub Nikolić, Serbian footballer
Slavoljub Eduard Penkala, Croatian engineer and inventor
Slavoljub Srnić, Serbian footballer
Slavko Vorkapić, a Serbian-American film director and editor, former Dean of USC Film School

Slavic masculine given names
Bulgarian masculine given names
Croatian masculine given names
Macedonian masculine given names
Montenegrin masculine given names
Slovene masculine given names
Serbian masculine given names